Vancouver Peninsula may refer to:

 Burrard Peninsula, encompassing the entire city of Vancouver as well as the city of Burnaby and other areas to the east
 Downtown Peninsula, encompassing Downtown Vancouver, the West End and Stanley Park
 Vancouver Peninsula, Western Australia, locality in the City of Albany, Western Australia